The Patriotic Union of Cuba (abbreviated UNPACU) is a Cuban dissident organization, described as one of the largest and most active dissident organizations in Cuba, which brings together numerous dissidents in Cuba. It was founded on 24 August 2011 by José Daniel Ferrer, after ceasing to be a member of the Christian Liberation Movement. It has defined itself as a civic organization that advocates for a peaceful but firm fight against any repression of civil liberties in the Republic of Cuba.

References

Cuban democracy movements
Cuban dissidents
Political organizations based in Cuba